"The Tractate Middoth" is a short ghost story by British author M. R. James. It was published in 1911 in More Ghost Stories, James's second collection of ghost stories.

Plot
Mr. Garrett, an employee of a university library, searches for a Mishnaic tractate for an impatient library patron named John Eldred. While searching, he encounters a black-clad clergyman who also seems interested in the book. The clergyman's appearance–his head appears to be enshrouded in cobwebs and he smells of mould and dust–causes Garrett a severe shock and he faints.  He is sent home to recover and later decides to recuperate at the seaside.

On the train to his destination, he meets the elderly Mrs. Simpson and her daughter, proprietors of a boarding house who offer him lodgings.  Over the course of his stay, they become very friendly. The Simpsons confide in him that they are losing a struggle with a rival heir to the estate of an eccentric clergyman named Rant, who died two decades earlier. As they describe the situation, Garrett realizes that John Eldred is the rival heir. The tractate supposedly contains a hidden secret will that would supersede an earlier last will and testament. Garrett decides to help the Simpsons by preventing Eldred from destroying this document.

Returning to the library, he finds that the tractate has been found already and shipped to Eldred at the Rant estate. He follows the book in another train, but arrives too late to stop Eldred from receiving the parcel. As he stalks Eldred back to the Rant mansion, he sees a dark form emerge from cobwebs at the side of the road, and Eldred drops dead. An inquest finds black dust on the dead man's face and in his mouth, but the real cause of death is heart failure. The tractate becomes evidence. When it appears that Eldred had been tearing out a page when he died, the missing will is discovered and decrypted, written in a coded script that looks like Hebrew. By its terms, Mrs. Simpson inherits the estate formerly possessed by Eldred, and Garrett and her daughter marry.

Adaptations
On 7 May 1951, an American television adaptation of the story was broadcast as "The Lost Will of Dr. Rant", as part of the Lights Out mystery series. It starred Leslie Nielsen.

On 26 February 1966, a version of the story adapted by Dennis Webb was broadcast by ATV and Thames Television as part of the Mystery and Imagination series of ghost story adaptations. It starred Giles Block, David Buck, and John Crocker. The episode was wiped after broadcast, and only audio recordings are known to have survived.

On 25 December 2007, the story was read on BBC Radio 4 by Derek Jacobi as part of the M R James at Christmas series.

On 25 December 2013, a version of the story, The Tractate Middoth, adapted by Mark Gatiss, was broadcast on BBC2 as part of the long-running A Ghost Story for Christmas series. It starred Sacha Dhawan, John Castle, Louise Jameson, Una Stubbs, David Ryall, Eleanor Bron, Nick Burns, and Roy Barraclough.

References

External links

 

 

1911 short stories
Ghosts in written fiction
Short stories by M. R. James
Short stories adapted into films
Horror short stories